The Ecuadoran spiny pocket mouse (Heteromys teleus) is a species of rodent in the family Heteromyidae. It is endemic to central western Ecuador, where it is found at elevations from sea level to 2000 m on the coastal plain and western slopes of the Andes. The species is nocturnal and lives in dry tropical evergreen forests of the southernmost extension of the Choco; it creates well-defined runways, and is often found near streams. It is threatened by deforestation and fragmentation of its remaining habitat.

References

Heteromys
Mammals of Ecuador
Mammals described in 2002